Borko Milenković (Serbian Cyrillic: Борко Миленковић; born July 10, 1984) is a Serbian footballer who plays for Tërbuni Pukë in the Albanian Superliga.

Career
Milenković previously played for FK Jagodina in the Serbian SuperLiga after having played for his hometown club FK Jedinstvo Paraćin. He has also played for Mornar of Montenegro, Novi Pazar, Timok and Sloga Kraljevo of Serbia and most recently Laçi and Tërbuni of Albania.

Honours
Laçi
 Albanian Cup (1): 2012–13

References

External links
 Profile and 2009-10 stats at Montenegrin Federation site.

1984 births
Living people
Serbian footballers
FK Jagodina players
FK Mornar players
FK Novi Pazar players
FK Timok players
FK Sloga Kraljevo players
Serbian SuperLiga players
Serbian expatriate footballers
Expatriate footballers in Albania
Kategoria Superiore players
KF Laçi players
Association football defenders
FK Temnić players
FK Tutin players